Ryan Kelly Chamberlain II is an American media and political consultant, who worked on the campaign of Gavin Newsom in his run for mayor of San Francisco. He was the subject of a nationwide FBI search beginning May 31, 2014, after evidence of explosives were reportedly found in his San Francisco apartment, and after he had allegedly posted a suicide note on Facebook. Details of the reasons for the manhunt were not immediately released by investigators. Chamberlain was arrested by the FBI in the evening on Monday June 2, 2014 within the San Francisco city limits. He was charged with possessing an illegal explosive device. Chamberlain allegedly had "four components necessary to comprise an IED" in his apartment, according to the FBI.

In 2016, Chamberlain pleaded guilty for possessing a biological toxin he obtained on the dark web as well as an unregistered handgun. The FBI withdrew all explosives charges. A review of the evidence indicated the only IED materials Chamberlain possessed were a hobbyist rocket motor, matchstick powder, a remote control, and a glass jar – all of which could be considered household items. The "biological agents" were a small non-lethal amount of abrin and sodium cyanide. Per Chamberlain, he had purchased the abrin and firearm on the dark web as a result of suicidal ideation. Chamberlain was sentenced to  years in prison.

References

American political consultants
Living people
People from San Francisco
2014 in California
American prisoners and detainees
Prisoners and detainees of California
Year of birth missing (living people)